Ministry of Petroleum and Mineral Resources may refer to:

 Ministry of Petroleum and Mineral Resources (Egypt)
 Ministry of Petroleum and Mineral Resources (Saudi Arabia)
 Ministry of Petroleum and Mineral Resources (Somalia)
 Ministry of Petroleum and Mineral Resources (Syria)

See also 
 Ministry of Petroleum